Agris Saviels (born January 15, 1982) is a Latvian former professional ice hockey defenseman. He last played for HK Mogo of the Latvian Hockey League (LAT).

Playing career
Saviels was drafted 63rd overall in the 2000 NHL Entry Draft by the Colorado Avalanche. Prior to be drafted, Saviels played in his native country Latvia with HK Lido Nafta Rīga before traveling to North America to play Junior with the Notre Dame Hounds and then the Owen Sound Attack of the Ontario Hockey League.

Saviels was signed by the Colorado Avalanche on July 23, 2002, but never played a game with the team, playing with their affiliate the Hershey Bears of the American Hockey League.

Since the 2005–06 season, Saviels has played in Europe in the Belarus, Russian, Slovak, Latvian and Danish leagues.

In the 2008–09 season, Saviels signed a one-year contract and started with Kontinental Hockey League club Dinamo Riga, but was soon sent down to the farm club, HK Riga 2000 of the Belarusian Extraleague. In January 2009, Saviels then transferred to fellow Belarusian team Metallurg Zhlobin and re-signed to an additional year to continue playing in the 2009–10 season.

On September 1, 2010, Saviels left for Italy and signed a one-year contract as a free agent with Valpellice in the Serie A. During the following season, Saviels returned for a second stint in Italy to end the 2011–12 season with HC Broncos Sterzing-Vipiteno.

On July 28, 2012, it was announced that Saviels had signed for his first venture into Ukraine with HC Kompanion-Naftogaz of the Professional Hockey League. In 28 games, Saviels registered only 3 assists from the Blueline.

On August 12, 2013, due to a pay dispute between players and Kompanion, Saviels returned to Latvia and signed a contract with HK Kurbads of the LHL.

Career statistics

Regular season and playoffs

International

References

External links
 
 
 

1982 births
Colorado Avalanche draft picks
Dinamo Riga players
Expatriate ice hockey players in Russia
Hershey Bears players
Ice hockey players at the 2006 Winter Olympics
Latvian ice hockey defencemen
Living people
Olympic ice hockey players of Latvia
Owen Sound Attack players
People from Jūrmala
Reading Royals players
Rødovre Mighty Bulls players
Torpedo Nizhny Novgorod players
HC Valpellice players